Abdul Jabbar (11 October 1919 – 21 February 1952) was a protester who was killed during the Bengali language movement in 1952 that took place in the erstwhile East Pakistan (currently Bangladesh). He is considered a martyr in Bangladesh.

Background
Jabbar was born on 11 October 1919 in Panchua under the Gaffargaon, Mymensingh, East Bengal, British Raj. Although he received his primary education in the local educational institution called pathsala (Dhopaghat Krishtobazar Primary School), he failed to continue his education owing to poverty.

Career 
Jabbar worked with his father farming in his village. He decided to travel to the river port town of Narayanganj by train. He got a job in Burma through an Englishman he met in Narayanganj. He worked there for 12 years before going back to Burma. He was recruited in the British Indian Navy during World War Two but was discharged after being injured during training. He was then working as a tailor. He came to Dhaka, East Pakistan in 1952 with his wife for the medical treatment of his mother-in-law in Dhaka Medical College Hospital.

Personal life 
In 1949, Jabbar married Amina Khatun, one of his friends’ sister and settled down. One and a half year after the marriage, Amina had a baby boy, who was named Nurul Islam Badol.

Events

On 21 February 1952 the students in Dhaka bought a procession demanding Bengali be made a state language defying the Section 144 (curfew) imposed by the police. Jabbar joined the rally when it reached Dhaka Medical college. There the police fired on the rally injuring Jabbar. He was admitted to Dhaka Medical College where he died.

Legacy
The Government of Bangladesh awarded Jabbar the Ekushey Padak in 2000. The Bhasa Shaheed Abdul Jabbar Ansar-VDP School & College school operated by Ansar and Village Defense Party in named after him. Shaheed Rafiq-Jabbar Hall is dorm of Jahangirnagar University is named after him and fellow language activist Rafiq Uddin Ahmed.

Gallery

References

1919 births
1952 deaths
Bengali language movement activists
Burials at Azimpur Graveyard
Recipients of the Ekushey Padak
20th-century Bengalis